Typha × smirnovii is a plant of hybrid origin, endemic to southern Russia. Initial collections were made in 1998 in the vicinity of Volgograd. The plant apparently originated as a cross between  the two very widespread species T. latifolia and T. laxmannii.  Typha × smirnovii grows in freshwater marshes.

References

smirnovii
Freshwater plants
Plant nothospecies
Endemic flora of Russia
Flora of South European Russia
Plants described in 2000